"Guys Like Me" is a song co-written and recorded by American country music artist Eric Church. It was released in January 2007 as the third single from his 2006 debut album Sinners Like Me. The song peaked at number 17 on the US Billboard Hot Country Songs chart and at number 99 on the Billboard Hot 100. Church wrote this song with Deric Ruttan.

Content
The narrator describes the ways in which his lifestyle appears incompatible with that of his partner. He hypothesizes that even though she has lots of other men interested in her, it is an act of God's will that motivates her to choose someone like himself.

Music video
The music video premiered in 2007 and was directed by Scott Speer.

Chart performance
"Guys Like Me" debuted at number 53 on the U.S. Billboard Hot Country Songs for the week of February 3, 2007.

Certifications

References

2006 songs
2007 singles
Eric Church songs
Capitol Records Nashville singles
Music videos directed by Scott Speer
Song recordings produced by Jay Joyce
Songs written by Deric Ruttan
Songs written by Eric Church